Little Red's Fantasy is an album led by trumpeter Woody Shaw which was recorded in 1976 and released on the Muse label. Little Red's Fantasy was reissued by Mosaic Records as part of Woody Shaw: The Complete Muse Sessions in 2013.

Reception

Scott Yanow of Allmusic stated, "The varied originals give the musicians strong foundations for their freewheeling and spontaneous solos, making this one of Woody Shaw's better recordings".

Track listing 
All compositions by Woody Shaw except as indicated
 "Jean Marie" (Ronnie Mathews) - 7:42
 "Sashianova" (Stafford James) - 10:00
 "In Case You Haven't Heard" - 6:26
 "Little Red's Fantasy" - 7:05
 "Tomorrow's Destiny" - 7:46

Personnel 
Woody Shaw - trumpet
Frank Strozier - alto saxophone
Ronnie Mathews - piano
Stafford James - bass
Eddie Moore - drums

References 

Woody Shaw albums
1978 albums
Muse Records albums
Albums produced by Michael Cuscuna